Emilio Agradi (12 July 1895 - 11 September 1971) was an Italian footballer who played for Inter Milan between 1914 and 1928 (except for the 1921–22 season, when he played for Modena).

External links
 Emilio Agradi's statistics

1895 births
Italian footballers
Inter Milan players
1971 deaths
Association football forwards